Saralyn Smith (born March 23, 1978 in Key West, Florida) is a female beach volleyball player from the United States who won the silver medal at the NORCECA Circuit 2009 at Guatemala playing with Beth Van Fleet.

She also participated in the Association of Volleyball Professionals tournaments since 2002. There she ended up in the 9th position many times.

College
Smith played basketball and volleyball at the University of Hartford. For her volleyball team she set the record for most blocks in a single game as well as career blocks per game average. She also ranks among the school career leaders in hitting percentage. In 1999 she led the America East Conference in blocks per game.

Graduated from Hartford and received the Ribicoff Scholarship, an honor given to the top senior (in a class of roughly 2,000) for academic excellence, leadership, and community service. In 2001, she received a master's degree in Organizational Behavior, and has worked part-time or full-time in that field ever since.

Awards

National team
 NORCECA Beach Volleyball Circuit Guatemala 2009  Silver Medal
 NORCECA Beach Volleyball Circuit Manzanillo 2009  Bronze Medal

References

External links
 Saralyn Smith's home page (archived)
 
 
 Saralyn Smith at the Association of Volleyball Professionals (archived)

1978 births
Living people
American women's beach volleyball players
Hartford Hawks women's basketball players
Hartford Hawks women's volleyball players
21st-century American women